Pelea may refer to:

 A genus of mammals containing a single species, the grey rhebok, Pelea capreolus
 A genus of Hawaiian plants in the family Rutaceae, now considered synonymous with Melicope

See also
Palea (disambiguation)